Sergei Mishchenko (born 19 May 1961) is a retired Kazakh football defender.

Mishchenko spent most of his career playing for FC Shakhter Karagandy. He also played for FC Kairat in the Soviet Top League.

Mishchenko made three appearances for the Kazakhstan national football team from 1995 to 1996.

References

External links

1961 births
Living people
Kazakhstani footballers
Kazakhstan international footballers
FC Shakhter Karagandy players
FC Kairat players
Association football defenders